Max Kalish (March 1, 1891 – 1945) was American sculptor born in Valozhyn, Belarus, and best known for his sculptures of laborers.

His Orthodox Jewish family emigrated to Cleveland, Ohio in 1893, when he was two years old.

He studied with Herman Matzen at the Cleveland School of Art; in New York City with Herbert Adams at the National Academy of Design, and in the studios of Alexander Stirling Calder and Isidore Konti; and in Paris with Paul Wayland Bartlett at the Académie Colorossi, and Jean Antoine Injalbert at the École des Beaux-Arts.

A travelling exhibition of his work, titled "Glorification of the U.S. Workingman", stopped in Detroit in January 1927.

Washington, D.C. publisher Willard M. Kiplinger commissioned Kalish to create fifty portrait statuettes of prominent figures in World War II era politics, arts and sciences. Kiplinger donated the statuettes to the Smithsonian Institution in 1944.

Kalish was the author of Labor Sculpture, largely a collection of photographs of these statues of workers.  Most of those statutes were in a Social realism style. Critic Emily Genauer wrote in 1938, "It is the workmen who dominate the American scene, and who have become as surely symbolic of their time as the pioneers in covered wagons, and the robber barons and the great merchant princes were in their respective eras." This was what Kalish portrayed in his art.

Works
Examples of Kalish's work can be found in:
 Baby’s Head, Canajoharie Library and Art Gallery, Canajoharie, New York
 Old Man Resting,  Massillon Museum, Massillon, Ohio
 Portrait of a Boy, North Carolina Museum of Art, Raleigh, North Carolina
  Gold Prospector, Canton Museum of Art, Canton, Ohio
  Head of Louis Kronberg, Museum of Fine Arts, Boston, Massachusetts
 Torso, Washington County Museum of Fine Arts, Hagerstown, Maryland
 Laborer at Rest, Newark Museum, Newark, New Jersey
 Torso (1925), Cleveland Museum of Art, Cleveland, Ohio
 Woodcutter (c1926)
 The Steelworker (c1926)
 The Discard (c1926)
 Spirit of American Labor (c1927)
 New Power
 The End of Day (1930), Smithsonian American Art Museum, Washington, D.C.
 Abraham Lincoln (1927–32), Board of Education, Cleveland, Ohio
  Man of Steel (before 1933), Smithsonian American Art Museum, Washington, D.C.

References

Further reading 

 Labor Sculpture by Max Kalish, A. N. A. Emily Genauer, editor. New York: Cornet Press, 1938.
 The Sculpture of Max Kalish. Noel Lawson Lewis, author. Cleveland: Fine Arts Pub. Co., 1933.

1891 births
1945 deaths
Cleveland School of Art alumni
20th-century American sculptors
20th-century American male artists
American male sculptors
Emigrants from the Russian Empire to the United States
American alumni of the École des Beaux-Arts
Jewish American artists
National Sculpture Society members
20th-century American Jews